The following is a list of events from 1857 in art.

Events
 June 22 – The South Kensington Museum, predecessor of the Victoria and Albert Museum, is opened by Queen Victoria in London.
 Lewis Carroll meets John Ruskin and begins to associate with the Pre-Raphaelites. In the same year, Ruskin publishes his Political Economy of Art.
 Dante Gabriel Rossetti, William Morris and Pre-Raphaelite friends begin painting the Oxford Union murals; Jane Burden first models for them.

Exhibitions
 May 5–October 17 – The Art Treasures of Great Britain exhibition is held in Manchester, one of the largest such displays of all time. Photographs are admitted.

Works

 Jean-Baptiste-Camille Corot
 Le concert champêtre (Musée Condé, Chantilly)
 The Destruction of Sodom
 Gustave Courbet – Louis Guéymard as Robert le Diable
 Thomas Couture
 The Supper after the Masked Ball
 The Duel after the Masked Ball
 Jean-Léon Gérôme – The Duel After the Masquerade (Suite d'un bal masqué) (original version)
 Hiroshige – Prints from One Hundred Famous Views of Edo including Plum Park in Kameido and Sudden Shower over Shin-Ōhashi bridge and Atake
 Robert Howlett – Isambard Kingdom Brunel Standing Before the Launching Chains of the Great Eastern (photograph)
 Arthur Hughes – The Mother's Grave
 Alexander Andreyevich Ivanov – The Appearance of Christ Before the People (begun 1837)
 Rudolf Koller – Cow in a Vegetable Garden (Die Kuh im Krautgarten)
 Benjamin Williams Leader – A Quiet Pool in Glenfalloch
 John Frederick Lewis – The Coffee Bearer
 Octave Penguilly L'Haridon – Combat of the Thirty
 Daniel Maclise – Peter the Great at Deptford Dockyard
 John Everett Millais – A Dream of the Past: Sir Isumbras at the Ford
 Jean-François Millet (both Musée d'Orsay, Paris)
 The Angelus (original version)
 The Gleaners
 Philip Richard Morris – The Good Samaritan
 Henry Nelson O'Neil – Eastward Ho!
 Emily Mary Osborn – Nameless and Friendless
 O. G. Rejlander – The Two Ways of Life (allegorical photomontage)
 Ernst Friedrich August Rietschel – Goethe–Schiller Monument
 Raden Saleh – The Arrest of Pangeran Diponegoro
 Jozef Van Lerius – Portrait of Henriette Mayer van den Bergh
 Ferdinand Georg Waldmüller – Corpus Christi Morning
 Henry Wallis – The Stonebreaker
 August Wredow – Iris Takes the Fallen Hero to Olympus (sculpture, Berlin)

Births
 February 12 – Eugène Atget, French photographer (died 1927)
 May 17 – Mary Devens, American pictorial photographer (died 1920)
 July 30 – Lucy Bacon, American Impressionist painter (died 1932)
 July 31 – Adolphe Willette, French illustrator (died 1926)
 September 10 – Adolphe Demange, French portrait painter (died 1927)
 September 22 – Étienne Terrus, French painter (died 1922)
 October 23 – Juan Luna, Filipino painter (died 1899)
 November 18 – Stanhope Forbes, British painter of the Newlyn school (died 1947)
 November 21 – Columbano Bordalo Pinheiro, Portuguese painter (died 1929)
 December 7 – Uroš Predić, one of the top three Serbian Realist painters, along with Paja Jovanović and Đorđe Krstić (died 1953)
 December 8 – Anna Bilińska, Polish painter (died 1893)
 December 22 – W. W. Quatremain, English landscape painter (died 1930)
 December 23 – Georges Picard, French decorative artist and illustrator (died 1943) 
 date unknown – Esther Kenworthy Waterhouse, English flower painter (died 1944)

Deaths
 January 30 – Agostino Aglio, Italian painter, decorator, and engraver (born 1777)
 March 18 – Nathan Cooper Branwhite, English miniature portrait painter, watercolourist and engraver (born c.1775)
 May 1 – Frederick Scott Archer, English sculptor and photographic pioneer (born 1813)
 May 16 – Vasily Tropinin, Russian painter (born 1776)
 June 11 – Moritz Retzsch, German painter and etcher (born 1779)
 October 10 – Thomas Crawford, American sculptor (born 1814)
 October 14 – Johan Christian Dahl, Norwegian landscape painter (born 1788)
 October 27 – John Blennerhassett Martin, American painter, engraver and lithographer (born 1797)
 November 14 – Cornelis Kruseman, Dutch painter (born 1797)
 December 3 – Christian Daniel Rauch, German sculptor (born 1777)
 December 16 – William Havell,  English landscape painter, part of the Havell family (born 1782)
 December 23 – Achille Devéria, French portrait painter and lithographer (born 1800)
 date unknown
 Nicholas Joseph Crowley, Irish portrait painter (born 1819)
 Luigi Rossini, Italian artist known for his etchings of ancient Roman architecture (born 1790)

References

 
Years of the 19th century in art
1850s in art